The Brazilian pavilion houses Brazil's national representation during the Venice Biennale arts festivals.

Background

Organization and building 

The pavilion was designed by Amerigo Marchesin and built in 1964.

Representation by year

Art 

 1950 — Roberto Burle Marx, Milton Dacosta, Cicero Dias, Emiliano Di Cavalcanti, Flavio de Carvalho, Candido Portinari, José Pancetti, Bruno Giorgi, Victor Brecheret, Livio Abramo, Oswaldo Goeldi
 1958 — Lasar Segall
 1956 — Aldemir Martins
 1960 — Antonio Bandeira, Danilo Di Prete, Manabu Mabe, Aloisio Magalhães, Teresa Nicolao, Loio-Pérsio, Mario Cravo Júnior
 1962 — Alfredo Volpi, Anna Letycia Quadros, Fernando Jackson Ribeiro, Gilvan Samico, Iberê Camargo, Isabel Pons, Ivan Serpa, Lygia Clark, Marcelo Grassmann, Rossini Quintas Perez, Rubem Valentim
 1964 — Abraham Palatnik, Alfredo Volpi, Almir Mavignier, Franz Weissmann, Frans Krajcberg, Glauco Rodrigues, Tarsila do Amaral
 1966 — Sergio de Camargo
 1968 — Lygia Clark
 1970 — Mary Vieira, Roberto Burle Marx
 1972 — Humberto Espíndola, Paulo Roberto Leal, Franz Weissmann
 1976 — Claudio Tozzi, Evandro Carlos Jardim, Regina Vater, Sergio Augusto Porto, Vera Chaves Barcellos
 1978 — Carlos Fajardo, G. T. O. (Geraldo Telles de Oliveira), Julio Martins da Silva, Luiz Aquila da Rocha Miranda, Maria Auxiliadora da Silva, Maria Madalena Santos Reinbolt, Paulo Gomes Garcez, Wilma Marins
 1980 — Anna Bella Geiger, Antonio Dias, Carlos Vergara, Paulo Roberto Leal
 1982 — Tunga, Sérgio de Camargo
 1984 — Eduardo Sued, Luiz Paulo Baravelli
 1986 — Gastão Manoel Henrique, Geraldo de Barros, Renina Katz, Washington Novaes
 1988 — José Resende, Juraci Dórea
 1990 — Frida Baranek, Daniel Senise, Francisco Brennand, Gilvan Samico, Wesley Duke Lee
 1993 — Angelo Venosa, Carlos Fajardo, Emmanuel Nassar
 1995 — Arthur Bispo do Rosário, Nuno Ramos
 1997 — Jac Leirner, Waltercio Caldas (Curator: Paulo Herkenhoff)
 1999 — Iran do Espírito Santo, Nelson Leirner (Curator: Ivo Mesquita)
 2001 — Vik Muniz, Ernesto Neto, Miguel Rio Branco, Tunga, (Curator: Germano Celant)
 2003 — Beatriz Milhazes, Rosângela Rennó (Curator: Alfons Hug)
 2005 — Chelpa Ferro, Caio Reisewitz (Curator: Alfons Hug)
 2007 — José Damasceno, Detanico & Lain (Curator: Jacopo Crivelli Visconti)
 2009 — Luiz Braga, Delson Uchôa (Curator: Ivo Mesquita)
 2011 — Artur Barrio (Curators: Moacir dos Anjos, Agnaldo Farias)
 2013 — Hélio Fervenza, Odires Mlászho, Lygia Clark, Max Bill, Bruno Munari (Curator: Luis Pérez-Oramas)
 2015 — André Komatsu, Antonio Manuel, Berna Reale (Curator: Luiz Camillo Osorio)
 2017 — Cinthia Marcelle (Curator: Jochen Volz)
 2019 — Benjamin de Burca, Bárbara Wagner (Curator: Gabriel Pérez-Barreiro)
 2022 — Jonathas de Andrade (Curators: Jacopo Crivelli Visconti, José Olympio da Veiga Pereira)

References

Bibliography

Further reading 

 
 
 
 

Brazilian art
National pavilions